Potpourri is a 1974 big band jazz album recorded by the Thad Jones/Mel Lewis Jazz Orchestra and released on the Philadelphia International Records label.  The album was nominated for a 1975 Grammy award in the category, "Best Jazz Performance - Big Band" and Thad Jones' arrangement of "Living for the City" was also nominated in the Best Instrumental Arrangement category that same year.

Track listing
LP side A:
 "Blues In A Minute" – 8:24
 "All My Yesterdays" – 4:31
 "Quiet Lady" – 7:31
 "Don't You Worry 'Bout a Thing" (Stevie Wonder) – 3:58
LP side B:
 "For the Love of Money" (Kenneth Gamble, Leon Huff, Anthony Jackson) – 4:12
 "Yours and Mine" – 3:46
 "Ambiance" (Marian McPartland; arranged by Jerry Dodgion) – 7:22
 "Living for the City" (Stevie Wonder) – 4:24
All songs composed and arranged by Thad Jones except as indicated.

Personnel
 Thad Jones – flugelhorn
 Mel Lewis – drums
 Roland Hanna – piano
 George Mraz – bass
 Jerry Dodgion – alto saxophone, flute
 Eddie Xiques – alto saxophone, flute, clarinet
 Billy Harper – tenor saxophone, clarinet
 Ron Bridgewater – tenor saxophone, clarinet
 Pepper Adams – baritone saxophone
 Jon Faddis – trumpet
 Jim Bossy – trumpet
 Steve Furtado – trumpet
 Cecil Bridgewater – trumpet
 Jimmy Knepper – trombone
 Quentin Jackson – trombone
 Billy Campbell – trombone
 Cliff Heather – trombone
 Buddy Lucas – harmonica, jaw harp

References / external links

 Philadelphia International Records  KZ 33152
 [ Allmusic]
 discogs.com, Accessed 2008 May 1

1974 albums
The Thad Jones/Mel Lewis Orchestra albums
Albums produced by Bobby Martin
Philadelphia International Records albums
albums recorded at Sigma Sound Studios